Charles "Charlie" Bass, is an American electrical engineer, academician and entrepreneur. He was the co-founder of the networking company Ungermann-Bass in 1979. Led by Ralph Ungermann and staffed by several colleagues from Zilog, Ungermann-Bass helped commercialize ethernet, had a successful IPO, and then was purchased by Tandem Computers.

Bass was also co-founder of Starlight Networks in late 1990, a software company involved in streaming media and Socket Mobile, Inc. in 1992.

In 1972, Bass received a Ph.D. in electrical engineering from the University of Hawaii.  He has taught at University of California, Berkeley; University of California, Santa Cruz; and Stanford University, and he worked for Zilog.  In 1989, he formed his own venture capital company, Bass Associates.  Bass is currently an advisor to Horizon Ventures.

References
University of Hawaii COE Distinguished Lecture Series Charlie Bass: How To Maneuver Venture Capital

21st-century American engineers
Living people
1941 births